The International Trophy of Lyon (or International Ice Dance Cup) is an annual international ice dancing competition. Organized by the Fédération Française Sports de Glace association, it is held every year in Lyon, France, in November, December, or January. Skaters compete on the senior, junior, and novice levels.

Senior medalists

Junior medalists

Advanced novice medalists

References

External links 
 

Figure skating competitions
International figure skating competitions hosted by France